The Battle of Aquilonia was fought in 293 BC between the Roman Republic and the Samnites. The Romans, led by the consul Lucius Papirius Cursor, were victorious.

History
According to Titus Livius, the Samnites were desperately short of men, and thus called a general muster to Aquilonia, which all men of Samnium were required to answer. There, they took strict religious oaths to their country, and were then forced to join the army upon an altar to the gods. If they refused, they were slain on the spot and their bodies left in a pile as a reminder to all others what would happen if they refused.

The more experienced men, or those chosen by friends, made up what was called the "Linen Legion", due to their linen tunics which were brightly decorated.

According to Livy a feeder of the sacred chickens (pullarius) in the Roman army falsely reported favorable auspices to the consul, and that this falsification was discovered prior to battle. Papirius responded that the ill omen applied only to the pullarius, and placed him in the front line. When he was struck dead by a javelin before battle began, the consul's interpretation was seen to be fulfilled.

During the battle, the Samnite line held its own for a long while, until a cloud of dust made by Papirius's auxilia cavalry frightened the Samnites, and convinced the Romans that the army of Spurius Carvilius Maximus, the other consul (at the time, besieging another city) had come to finish them off. A cavalry charge on the Samnite center eventually broke the army and they routed.

After the battle, the Samnites fled into the city of Aquilonia itself, and their camp. The camp was captured and looted by the Romans, while taking the city itself proved more difficult. The city was eventually taken, with many of the Samnite survivors being slaughtered in the fighting. The loot taken from the Samnites was so extravagant, according to Livy, that there was enough gold and silver to decorate all the public buildings of Rome, with some left over to decorate the public buildings of other Roman cities as well.

Papirius Cursor was unanimously decreed a triumph, and a period of seven days thanksgiving was declared in his honor.

Site of the battle
The precise site is unknown, but the probable location would be between modern regions Lazio and Molise. There was also a Roman city called Aquilonia, which is modern Lacedonia in Campania, so it was previously supposed it was the site of the battle. Because of this, in 1861, the neighbouring town of Carbonara was renamed Aquilonia.

References

Aquilonia
Aquilonia
Aquilonia
Aquilonia
Aquilonia
3rd century BC in the Roman Republic